Daniel Martínez or Martinez may refer to:

 Daniel Martínez (politician) (born 1957), Uruguayan politician
 Daniel Joseph Martinez (born 1957), American artist
 Daniel Martinez (footballer, born 1973), Swedish footballer
 Daniel Martínez (footballer, born 1981), Uruguayan footballer
 Daniel Martínez (footballer, born 1991), Uruguayan footballer
 Daniel Martínez (cyclist) (born 1996), Colombian racing cyclist
 Daniel Martínez (footballer, born 1997), Argentine footballer